The 1917 Michigan Agricultural Aggies football team represented Michigan Agricultural College (MAC) as an independent during the 1917 college football season. In their ninth non-consecutive year under head coach Chester Brewer (Brewer previously coached the Aggies from 1903 to 1910), the Aggies compiled a 0–9 record and were outscored by their opponents 179 to 23.

This season marks the only time in team history in which they went winless on the field; in 1994, the Spartans finished with a 5-6 record, but this was changed to 0-11 after an academic scandal led to the forfeiture of their victories.

Schedule

Game summaries

Michigan

On October 20, 1917, the Aggies played their annual game against Michigan at Ferry Field. It was the 12th game between the two schools dating back to 1898.  Michigan had won eight of the prior 11 games. Michigan won the 1917 game by a score of 27 to 0. Michigan scored in the first quarter on a drive that featured a 30-yard run by Tad Wieman and was capped by a 15-yard touchdown run by Archie Weston. At halftime, the schools' combined bands led a detachment of troops onto the field and played the "Star Spangled Banner" and "The Victors". In the third quarter, the Wolverines scoring drive began with a 20-yard punt return by Weston with Wieman scoring on a seven-yard run.  In the fourth quarter, Wieman ran through the middle of the M.A.C. line, "shook off five tacklers," and scored on a 35-yard touchdown run. Later in the fourth quarter, Weston ran 30 yards around the left end to the M.A.C. 12-yard line, and Wieman scored his third touchdown of the afternoon on a one-yard run.

References

Michigan Agricultural
Michigan State Spartans football seasons
College football winless seasons
Michigan Agricultural Aggies football